Gene Ellen Kreyche Pratter (born February 25, 1949) is a United States district judge of the United States District Court for the Eastern District of Pennsylvania and former nominee to the United States Court of Appeals for the Third Circuit.

Education and career

Born in Chicago, Illinois, Pratter received her Artium Baccalaureus degree from Stanford University in 1971, and her Juris Doctor from University of Pennsylvania Law School in 1975. Her entire career in private practice was spent at the Philadelphia, Pennsylvania, law firm of Duane Morris, including as general counsel from 1999 to 2004.

District court service

Pratter was nominated by President George W. Bush on November 3, 2003, to a seat on the United States District Court for the Eastern District of Pennsylvania vacated by William H. Yohn Jr. She was confirmed by the Senate on June 15, 2004, and received her commission on June 16, 2004.

Third Circuit nomination under Bush

On November 15, 2007, she was nominated by President George W. Bush to a seat on the United States Court of Appeals for the Third Circuit vacated by Judge Franklin Stuart Van Antwerpen, who assumed senior status in 2006. In February 2008, the liberal group Leadership Conference on Civil Rights sent a letter to the Democrat-controlled Senate Judiciary Committee, then chaired by Senator Patrick Leahy, D-VT. The group claimed that Pratter had as a district court judge, "exhibited a willingness to prematurely dismiss the claims of civil rights plaintiffs and to inhibit advocacy by their counsel, thus denying these plaintiffs access to a full and fair legal process." As a result, Leahy refused to process her nomination for the rest of the 110th Congress. In an act of reconciliation with the Senate Democrats, Bush withdrew her nomination in July 2008 in favor of Paul S. Diamond.

See also
George W. Bush judicial appointment controversies

References

Sources

1949 births
Living people
Lawyers from Chicago
Stanford University alumni
University of Pennsylvania Law School alumni
Judges of the United States District Court for the Eastern District of Pennsylvania
United States district court judges appointed by George W. Bush
21st-century American judges
21st-century American women judges